

Teodosie Bârcă (1894 – ?) was a Bessarabian politician, member of Sfatul Țării, the parliament that voted the Union of Bessarabia with Romania.

Biography
He was born in Tătărăuca Nouă, Soroksky Uyezd, Bessarabia Governorate. Bârcă served as Member of Sfatul Țării in 1917–1918.

Gallery

Bibliography
Gheorghe E. Cojocaru, Sfatul Țării: itinerar, Civitas, Chișinău, 1998, 
Mihai Tașcă, Sfatul Țării și actualele autorități locale, Timpul de dimineață, no. 114 (849), June 27, 2008 (page 16)

External links
 Arhiva pentru Sfatul Țării
 Deputații Sfatului Țării și Lavrenti Beria

Notes

Moldovan MPs 1917–1918
1894 births
Year of death missing
Deputy Presidents of the Moldovan Parliament
People from Soroksky Uyezd